is a role-playing video game developed and published by Nippon Ichi Software for the PlayStation. The second installment in the Marl Kingdom series, it was released three times — once in 1999, once as Little Princess+1: Marl Ōkoku no Ningyō Hime 2 in 2000, and then in the PSone Books series in 2001.

Little Princess takes place twelve years after the epilogue of Rhapsody: A Musical Adventure, and features several of the same characters. The tactical role-playing game battle system of Rhapsody was discarded for a more traditional RPG battle system.  Like its predecessor, Little Princess includes many musical interludes and focuses on the themes of falling in love and fulfilling your dreams.

As of 2020, the game is available for download via the PlayStation Store, and is playable on either the PSP or PlayStation 3. The download became available on May 31, 2007, only in Japan.

Plot
Little Princess starts off many years after where Rhapsody: A Musical Adventure left off. Cornet, having saved Prince Ferdinand in Rhapsody, is now the ruler of Marl Kingdom. They have one daughter, Kururu, named after Cornet's fairy puppet friend/mother. Now twelve years old, Kururu, joined by her best friend Crea Rosenqueen, wants to go on a journey to find her own knight in shining armor.

While taking a walk through the forest, Kururu and Crea are attacked by a dragon and saved by a mysterious boy named Cello, much like how Cornet and Ferdinand met years before.  Kururu does not immediately fall in love with Cello (mostly because he calls her "Pumpkin Pants," after her taste in clothing), and initially hates him. Over the course of her quest he repeatedly appears out of nowhere to help her.

Elsewhere, a battle is brewing between the two families of witches—the Marjoly Family (the villains of the first game) and the Akurjo Family.  The Akurjo Family is attempting to steal the Shadow of Beauty, a wish-granting gemstone that Marjoly has always treasured (as it is a memento of her first love, Keeldear).  To keep the Akurjo Family from taking the jewel, Marjoly breaks it into pieces and scatters the shards across the country.  Both of the witch families then begin searching for the shards, each trying to complete the gem first.  Kururu, Crea, and Cello are soon involved with the search as well, as Cello needs the Shadow of Beauty to heal his mother's illness.  As they work together, Kururu realizes that she is falling in love with Cello.

Once the pieces have all been collected, Kururu gathers the courage to confess her feelings to Cello. The moment she does, it is revealed that Cello's mother is Akurjo, who subsequently teleports away with him.

Kururu, determined not to give up on Cello, battles her way through Akurjo's castle to find Cello.  Upon meeting him again, Cello tries to fight Kururu, but finally admits that he loves Kururu as well.  He then collapses.  Marjoly uses her magic to let Kururu enter Cello's heart to heal him.  In this way, Kururu gets to experience his tragic past firsthand.

After the final battle with Akurjo, everyone (including the Marjoly Family) wishes together on the Shadow of Beauty for Akurjo to be healed of her illness.  This succeeds, but Akurjo retreats into the Netherworld, saying she needs to cool her head (though Marjoly points out that Akurjo wants to say "thank you", and is just too stubborn to do so).  Cello decides to go to the Netherworld to look after his mother, but promises Kururu that he will someday return to her.

Four years later, Kururu and Crea take a walk in the forest (just as they did at the beginning of the game), and again, Cello appears to save them from a dragon.

The game ends there, and its story continues in the second chapter of Tenshi no Present.

Characters
, a.k.a. , is the game's protagonist and the daughter of Cornet and Ferdinand.  She has a tendency to sneak out of the castle instead of studying, and is identified by the other characters as a tomboy. She has known Crea since they were children. According to Tenshi no Present, she later becomes famous throughout her kingdom as the 'Pumpkin Princess', because her trousers resemble a pumpkin.  These trousers are often a source of humour, as some characters refer to her as 'pumpkin pants' to tease her.
In a flashback at one point, it is shown that when Crea was young, the other children often picked on her, teasing her because she did not have a father. However, the first time she met Kururu, Kururu saved her by fighting off the bullies. The two of them became very close friends after that.
 is Kururu's main love interest, although he is initially not very friendly to her.
Near the beginning of the game, Cello occasionally appears to give her cryptic advice and help her.  He takes on a larger role after the birthday party of Queen Siegrind, during which he sneaks into the castle and attempts to steal the five treasures that act as a key to Beauty Castle (the home of Marjoly and the Shadow of Beauty).  He explains that he needs the Shadow of Beauty to heal his ailing mother, who has a terminal illness.  His 'mother', however, is Akurjo, by adoption.
Near the end of the game, Kururu has a vision of the distant past, and through this the player learns Cello's history.  It is explained that his parents died in a war with a neighbouring country, and he ended up becoming friends with Kururu's grandmother, Cherie (although, because Cherie and Cello are time travellers, these events are transpiring long before the birth of Kururu's grandfather).  When destruction of the Ancient race seemed imminent, Cherie and Cello tried to use the Light of Beauty (a wish-granting jewel related to the Shadow of Beauty) to escape to the future.  However, Cello was very anxious over the future, and so his wish was not as strong as Cherie's; they ended up in completely different time periods.  Soon after Cello's arrival in the future, he met Akurjo, who decided to adopt him, apparently with the intention of manipulating him for her own purposes.

 is a knight who works at the castle.  He became a knight in order to become stronger after the death of his little sister, since he felt guilty over not being able to protect her.
Although Sonia considers him to be weak and often scolds him, he secretly loves her.  In the second chapter of Tenshi no Present, he is engaged to Sonia, and as of the sixth chapter of the same game, they are married and expecting their first child.

 is a female knight and Geo's daughter.  She is popular amongst the people of Mothergreen, particularly the women, and possesses her own fan club, but shows little interest in romance.  Though she treats Kururu strictly, some of her thoughts and flashbacks indicate that Sonia does care about Kururu, and that she wants for the princess to grow up properly and follow her dreams.  This is partially because Sonia feels that her own dream (succeeding her father as a knight) was difficult to realise, and that one can't be pampered if they are trying to achieve something.
In the second chapter of Tenshi no Present, she is engaged to Randy; however, financial concerns prevent them from holding the wedding until sometime after the end of the chapter.  In the sixth chapter, Sonia and Randy inform Geo of Sonia's pregnancy, news he takes joyfully.

Gameplay
Like Rhapsody, Little Princess is an RPG. Characters join the party, level up, equip things, etc. The player controls Kururu around different areas. There are multiple difficulties, but the game over all is viewed as more challenging than Rhapsody.

Battle

The battle system has changed drastically from Rhapsody's tactics style fights. Little Princess features a more traditional RPG, turn-based battle system, with the enemy characters on the left-hand side of the screen and the player characters on the right. Unlike the battle system in Rhapsody (in which one controlled the game's main character and three puppets or monsters), only human characters fight. Puppets are equipped to specific characters, and are used to cast magic; instead of MP (magic points), money is taken with each spell in small amounts. Furthermore, a character's equipped puppets receive experience in battle and level up at roughly the same rate as the player, regardless of whether they are actually used in battle. Each time the player uses a puppet, a note is added to the musical staff on the battle screen; when a full bar is completed, the number to the right of the staff increases by one and the notes are cleared, allowing the player to fill up more bars with notes. A predecessor of the Reward system was present in the previous game; however, in Little Princess, one receives notes after using puppet magic (rather than after playing the trumpet to boost the puppets' statistics), since the central character of Little Princess cannot play her trumpet in battle.
As only two of the game's characters are able to equip and use puppets, most human characters have special skills or techniques equivalent to magic, and one character is able to use monsters (which can be captured after battle, as in Rhapsody) in much the same way as puppets.

Legacy
Along with Rhapsody: A Musical Adventure and Tenshi no Present: Marl Ōkoku Monogatari, this game is part of the Marl Kingdom series. Little Princess maintains the emphasis on musical numbers and themes of love introduced in Rhapsody, as well as the anime inspired, bright graphics, which are used in several later Nippon Ichi Software games. Previously Rhapsody, Little Princess had not been released outside Japan, possibly due to Rhapsody's low level of mainstream popularity, but as of Summer 2023, a European and North American release are announced.

PlayStation Store
The game was made available for download via the PlayStation Store on May 31, 2007. However, the download was only available in Japan. NIS America has announced A Launch date due in Summer 2023 bringing it to North America.

Soundtrack
A soundtrack for the game's music was released on March 8, 2000. The music, like in the other Marl games, was handled by Tenpei Sato.

Track list:
Little Princess ~ Main Theme
Princess Kururu
Marl's Lane
Wonderful World
Daydream
A Tomboy Princess
Starting Over
Because We Are Always Together
Winged Boy
The Way of Making Good Soft Cream
Mothergreen
Let's Go Walking ~ Etoile's Love
It's...the Front of the Back?
A Customer's Here!
Kururu's Memories
Evil Queen
Puppet Crisis
The Karkanskys and the Baknekoffs
Rosen Queenland
The Little Princess' Decision ~ Sending My Thoughts into Eternity
Hysteric Ceremony
We are the Witch-Tribe
Eyes of the Princess
First Love
Uru-uru Kururu
Under the Rule of the Soldier
Sky-Palace of the Witches
The Law of the Noble Flower
Last Dance
The Little Princess' Decision ~ So That Thoughts May Be Handed Down Through Generations

Reception
On release, Famitsu magazine scored the game a 30 out of 40.

References

External links

Role-playing video games
Japan-exclusive video games
Marl Kingdom
PlayStation (console) games
PlayStation Network games
Video game sequels
Nippon Ichi Software games
Video games developed in Japan
Video games about witchcraft
1999 video games
Single-player video games
Video games featuring female protagonists
Video games scored by Tenpei Sato